, also known as , is a fictional character from the Spike Chunsoft visual novel action-adventure game series Danganronpa. The character has two identities: Izuru first appeared in the 2011 light novel prequel Danganronpa Zero by Kazutaka Kodaka as a mysterious high school student whose actions resulted in genocide, while a computer avatar copy of Hajime appeared as the protagonist of the 2012 video game Danganronpa 2: Goodbye Despair, as a high school student with no memory of his past, forced to investigate murder cases involving high school students who are trapped on a group of tropical islands. The prequel anime Danganronpa 3: The End of Hope's Peak High School further explores the past of the human Hajime and how he volunteered to undergo experimentation to become the silent sociopathic superhuman Izuru.

Hajime was created to be a caring student who would be explored as a more tragic hero, in contrast with his predecessor, the Danganronpa protagonist Makoto Naegi. The franchise explores the themes of despair and hope; as a result of his sins, Izuru's activities involve a search for redemption. Their prequel personas were also modified to fit the narrative involving their lack of self-esteem and relationships with Junko Enoshima and Mukuro Ikusaba, two antagonists from the series who attempt to manipulate him for their terrorist attacks. The character is voiced by Minami Takayama in Japanese and Johnny Yong Bosch in English.

Critical response to the character has been positive, in particular their interpersonal relationship with other characters and the voice actors' vocal performances. The character's role at The End of Hope's Peak High School was praised for the handling of his alter ego's origin story and depiction of degraded humanity.

Creation 

Danganronpa writer Kazutaka Kodaka created Hajime Hinata as a major contrast to his predecessor, Makoto Naegi. While Makoto's story involves his holding onto hope as a result of his morals, Hajime moves forward carrying the burden of despair in consequence of the sins he committed with his past persona known as Izuru Kumukura. The connection between Izuru and Hajime was foreshadowed in the light novel Danganronpa Zero as kanji for Hajime's full name was conceived as a hint to his other persona, as "日向創" can be read as "Kamukura".

The writing staff describes Hajime as a relatable person, due to how ordinary he is in contrast to the rest of the cast from Goodbye Despair. With regards to his appearance, Hajime was the earliest character designed by Rui Komatsuzaki, who created a major contrast between Hajime's white clothing and Nagito Komaeda's dark clothing. His relatable characterization was meant to give him a notable character arc, as throughout the story he shows weakness due to his lack of talents despite his attempts to act as an ordinary person. Hajime's final appearance differed from that in early sketches for the series, as his hair was originally meant to be longer, and, at one point, he was to be wearing glasses.

Nagito was meant to be "an absolute rival" to Hajime, a relationship similar to that between the Joker and Batman in the 1989 film. Meanwhile, the character of Chiaki Nanami was written as a heroine with whom Hajime would often interact and bond romantically, as Kodaka claims that the relationship between Makoto and Kyoko Kirigiri, a supporting character from the previous game, was meant to help the player in solving cases thanks to the latter's skills as a detective. Kodaka attempted to create more unique storytelling methods for Goodbye Despair. This is more specific when Hajime, the player's avatar, starts playing the video game Twilight Syndrome as the narrative of game is also connected with the events of Goodbye Despair.

Casting
In the Japanese version of the game, Hajime was voiced by Minami Takayama. As Takayama was famous for voicing the main character of the detective manga Case Closed, the staff put a reference to her career in the snowboarding minigame from Goodbye Despair, as Jimmy Kudo often surfs a turbo skateboard. Takayama was selected to voice the character based on her popularity from Case Closed, in order to make Hajime seem like a detective.

For the English dub of the franchise, Johnny Yong Bosch took the role of Hajime. Bosch recalls having difficulty becoming immersed in Hinata's role, due to the lack of artwork that featured Hinata. When a Danganronpa player asked the actor to sign a copy of Goodbye Despair, Bosch could better understand the character he voiced. In the stage play, Ryusei Yokohama portrays the character.

Characterization and development
Kodaka described the Hajime of the anime Danganronpa 3: The End of Hope's Peak High School as someone who recklessly worked hard to do his best, despite his lack of an Ultimate Talent, in contrast with his past persona in the light novel and anime prequels. Kodaka felt the anime explicated the differences between Izuru and Hajime, which were not fully explored in the game. Izuru was described as a god-like entity to the point of being deemed as the strongest character Kodaka ever created in fiction. However, Kodaka believes that Hajime is stronger for embracing his own human qualities, comparing both identities with that of Junko Enoshima, the antagonist of the first Danganronpa game. For the Hope Arc of the series' anime, Kodaka stated that the two minds of the character had merged under the Izuru Kamukura name. Kodaka was satisfied with how anime staff from Lerche handled Izuru, while also enjoying his portrayal as an emotionless, silent but "elegant" character at the same time.

In Goodbye Despair, it is revealed that Hajime and his classmates are terrorists with amnesia, and that they used to be called the Remnants of Despair. In contrast with Goodbye Despair, Kodaka aimed for the younger Remnants of Despair to be characterized differently to reflect their original personalities; this resulted in Hajime being written in a more hatred-driven manner, due to his lack of talents before meeting another character named Chiaki Nanami, the original version of the heroine from the game. Nevertheless, Kodaka planned for the meeting of the human Hajime's and the human Chiaki to be integral to the narrative, based on how the two bonds when playing games. In developing the lead character of Danganronpa V3: Killing Harmony, Kodaka felt that both Hajime and Makoto were written to be "too strong" as video game protagonists, leading him to write a "weaker" lead for the next game.

Kodaka thanked the Lerche staff from the anime for how faithful Izuru was to his original version. Having been briefly explored in the light novel and Goodbye Despair, Kodaka wrote Hajime's darker persona as somebody who ironically finds everything boring, since Hajime wants to become special like the students from Hope's Peak Academy. His design was carefully revised to have a "beautiful, elegant dance" while his hair was stiffer than in early materials. Kodaka was glad with the character's design, especially with how emotionless his eyes were. Due to how powerless the famous Junko Enoshima is in comparison to Izuru, the scenes involving how the former manipulates the latter were written to show Junko at her lowest, since she could not defeat Izuru in combat. So, the writers focused on psychology involving their passions. Famitsu found that the scene where Izuru steps on Junko has a great effect on his enemy. Junko's voice actress, Megumi Toyoguchi, claimed there were no notes in the script about how to perform that scene, so she acted on her own.

Manga News compared him with Kyoko Kirigiri based on how both cannot remember their pasts, as well their similar talents. Koi-Nya and HardCore Gaming 101 felt he was a fitting protagonist, similar to Makoto, as both do not possess major talents and have to rely on their normal abilities to solve problems. DualShockers claimed that Hajime dramatically changed during the game's narrative, despite the dark story, evidenced by how he bonds with the other cast members. Due to his dark characterization and how he lacks Hajime's humanity, Manga.Tokyo compared Izuru with Star Wars villain Darth Vader, although the reviewer felt Hajime's corruption to be more forced in comparison to Vader's.

Appearances

In Danganronpa Zero
Izuru is first mentioned in the light novel Danganronpa Zero as a detective (Kyoko Kirigiri) investigates him. Izuru is described as a student of indeterminate gender hiding on the grounds of the school, and the perpetrator of "The Tragedy", an event involving mass murder that resulted in the decay of mankind. It is believed Izuru was allied with the antagonist of the first Danganronpa game, Junko Enoshima, whom he aided in the Tragedy. Ryoko Otonashi learns that Izuru is hiding inside the old school building, but fails to find him, instead finding her boyfriend and Ultimate Despair collaborator, Yasuke Matsuda, who, briefly adopting Izuru's identity, kills Yuto Kamishiro to cover up Izuru's and Junko's roles in the Tragedy. The real Izuru is then briefly glimpsed by Kyoko, who mistakes him for one of the similarly long-haired Madarai octuplets.

In Danganronpa video games
In Danganronpa 2: Goodbye Despair, Izuru is reintroduced under his birth name, Hajime Hinata. Hajime and his classmates are trapped into a killing game on a group of tropical islands by the bear-like robot Monokuma. With his investigative skills, Hajime helps solve the murder mysteries and finds every murderer. He is a rival of Nagito Komaeda, who suspects there is a traitor in the group working for "World Ender". When Nagito fakes his suicide to apparently expose the traitor by tricking them into unknowingly killing them, Hajime realizes his friend Chiaki Nanami is the traitor and culprit, and she is executed. After Chiaki's execution, Hajime uncovers the truth behind Jabberwock Island being a simulated reality and himself being a computer avatar copy of the childhood memories his real self: terrorist leader Izuru Kamukura. Originally part of the Reserve Course, a section of Hope's Peak Academy for students without ultimate talents, the original Hajime had volunteered to become a test subject in the Hope Cultivation Project, becoming a superintelligent superhuman soldier and acquiring multiple talents at the cost of his original personality and sense of self. Renamed after the founder of Hope's Peak Academy and dubbed , Izuru soon grew bored with the world, due to being unable to relate to anyone, and was convinced by the like-minded Junko Enoshima to form the  organization in an attempt to alleviate his boredom, participating in widespread acts of indiscriminate genocide against the human race. Following Junko's death, Izuru took control of the Remnants of Despair and arranged for them to be captured by Future Foundation agent and former killing game survivor and new "Ultimate Hope" Makoto Naegi, manipulating him into going rogue and placing him and the Remnants into a virtual reality created by the Future Foundation's Neo World Program in an attempt at "rehabilitating" them, into which Izuru releases an artificial intelligence copy of Junko (made at the moment of her death and dubbed Alter Ego Junko) with the express purpose of allowing her to download herself into a number of the other Remnants' bodies and other Future Foundation agents following a simulated killing game between their amnesiac selves to erase their minds. Ultimately, Hajime decides to delete Alter Ego Junko instead, even if he dies in the aftermath, in which a merged and content Izuru/Hajime overlooks the island. Hajime has also appeared in the manga adaptations of Goodbye Despair.

Izuru is briefly seen during the epilogue of the spin-off Danganronpa Another Episode: Ultra Despair Girls, set between the events of the first and second games, while ripping out parts of the mechanical bears Kurokuma and Shirokuma while transporting them via wheelbarrow, before preparing future plans with Alter Ego Junko.

Hajime appears alongside Yasuhiro Hagakure and Makoto in the game demo for Danganronpa V3: Killing Harmony, with Hajime and Makoto as Kaede Akamatsu's upper classmates, senior "protagonists", and major helpers, before being revealed to be an actor in the epilogue. In the main storyline, both the Izuru and Hajime identities are adopted by the new mastermind, the Danganronpa V3: Killing Harmony reality television showrunner, in the sixth chapter.

In Danganronpa anime
Hajime appears in Despair Arc of the anime Danganronpa 3: The End of Hope's Peak High School as a high school student suffering from an inferiority complex as a result of his lack of talent. Despite being comforted by a student, the original "Chiaki Nanami", about how talents are not necessary for him to stand out, Hajime decides to take part in the Izuru Kamukura Project with his parents' consent, sacrificing himself to become Izuru. While finding himself lacking a true sense of purpose and connection to the world, Izuru meets Junko and Mukuro Ikusaba after thwarting their attempt to assassinate him. Recognizing the pair as kindred spirits, who then become attracted by his skills, Izuru allies with the sisters in arranging a killing game and forming the Ultimate Despair organization, with the ultimate goal of causing the fall of human civilisation. Upon successfully instigating a worldwide apocalypse, Izuru adopts a neutral stance to observe the "unpredictability" of despair and hope, promising to take a more active stance when the situation calls for it.

Izuru/Hajime have also appeared in the other story arcs in the anime. In Future Arc, at some point during the Tragedy, Makoto explains that he found Izuru and captured him to place him in the virtual world, for which he is put on trial for treason by the Future Foundation for doing so, and refusing too disclose the location of Izuru and the remaining Remnants of Despair. Subsequently, Izuru/Hajime and his former friends from the virtual world from the game return to the real world, now seeking to spread despair in the name of hope rather than for the sake of despair alone. In the anime's finale, Hope Arc, Izuru/Hajime and the Remnants of Despair locate the final mastermind Ryota Mitarai after killing his followers, and convince him to give up on his cause and join their group. Izuru/Hajime shares a nod of approval with Makoto as he leaves, before sending out a worldwide proclamation of world domination in order to clear the Future Foundation of responsibility for Ryota's and his Future Foundation associates' own killing game. In the original video animation Nagito Komaeda and the Destroyer of Worlds, it is shown how Izuru/Hajime managed to restore Nagito's subconsciousness so that he and the others would return to the real world before the events of Hope, creating an artificial intelligence duplicate of himself dubbed the "World Ender".

Reception

Popularity
In a popularity poll ranking the franchise characters, for the collected release of Trigger Happy Havoc and Goodbye Despair, Hajime took the third spot, behind Nagito Komaeda and Makoto Naegi. To celebrate, Rui Komatsuzaki did an illustration of the top five to be featured in the re-release of the games, Reload. In late 2020, the NetEase survival-horror game Identity V launched "Identity V x Danganronpa Crossover II", the second part of its collaboration with the Danganronpa series. To mark the occasion, Identity Vs official Japanese Twitter account revealed a new crossover illustration drawn by Tokyo Chronos illustrator and character designer LAM, who drew Hajime alongside other characters from the series. During 2016, in Tokyo, as part of a collaboration between Danganronpa and Absolute to promote the anime, fans could interact with the voice actors, with Takayama reprising her role of Hajime. In a 2021 poll, Hajime was voted as the fourth best Danganronpa character.

Critical
Critical response to the character, as both Izuru and Hajime, has been positive, with many comparing elements of the characterizations with other cast members featured in Danganronpa. The final twist in Goodbye Despair, where Hajime is revealed to be Junko's partner Izuru, was praised by Rice Digital as one of the franchise's most striking twists, as it alters the gamers' perception regarding him alongside the rest of the cast members, who are similarly revealed to be the Remnants of Despair terrorists, rather than their previous caring personas. Anime News Network felt that Hajime became famous in the franchise for how corrupted he becomes, in contrast to his initial persona, something which the critic blamed on Nagito's philosophies.Comic Book Resources listed Izuru as the most intelligent Danganronpa character, based on how the Kamukura Project provided Hajime's new identity with all of the talents he could possibly have, thus becoming the most powerful character in the franchise. The Fandom Post and Biggest in Japan enjoyed the bond that both Hajime and Chiaki had in the anime.  Comic Book Resources placed this relationship as the best reason why Goodbye Despair needs to be adapted as an anime since in such game Hajime also befriended the AI based on such character.

Commenters also focused on the Izuru Kamukura character, Hajime's alter ego. The Gamer listed Izuru–Hajime as the sixth best Danganronpa character, saying that despite his chaotic background, his efforts to redeem himself make him a "complex hero". Both Manga.Tokyo and Anime News Network felt that Hajime became a tragic character due to losing all of his memories following the human experiments, losing the bond he formed with Chiaki in the process. Both Kotaku and Anime News Network commented on the encounter between Izuru and Nagito but had mixed feelings about the former, finding their similarities enjoyable while the latter deemed them as fan service due to the lack of impact. Gaming Trend praised Izuru's relationship with Junko, based on the latter's popularity within the franchise. There was also commentary with regard to the nearly emotionless Izuru reacting to the death of Chiaki, which came across as an important emotional scene, as Izuru starts crying when seeing her in her last moments. Thanasis Karavasilis, of Manga.Tokyo, felt the anime managed to give Hajime a strong finish and praised the encounter between him and the villain Mitarai, as in their encounter neither was portrayed as the greater culprit.

The voice actors of Hajime have been well received. Johnny Yong Bosch's performance as Hajime in the English dub of the anime was the subject of praise by Anime News Network. In a Japanese poll by AnimeAnime, Hajime was voted as the fourth best character voiced by Minami Takayama, sharing the fourth spot with Nabiki Tendo from Ranma ½. In another poll from 2021, Hajime took the 11th spot.  In describing the "dream" Japanese cast of Goodbye Despair, Kotaku remarked on Takayama's work, mostly due to her work in Detective Conan and Full Metal Alchemist: Brotherhood which would attract fans from both series.

References

Danganronpa characters
Fictional characters with alter egos
Fictional characters with amnesia
Fictional characters with heterochromia
Fictional mass murderers
Fictional private investigators
Fictional Japanese people in video games
Genetically engineered characters in video games
Male characters in video games
Fictional terrorists
Video game characters introduced in 2011